Kampung Lombong is a small village in Section 29, Shah Alam, Selangor, Malaysia.

The village is accessible through Jalan Kampung Lombong (from Puchong and Bandar Saujana Putra) and Jalan Kebun (from Klang, Kota Kemuning and Bukit Rimau). This road connects to various major highways and expressways namely KESAS , SKVE  and ELITE .

Shah Alam
Villages in Selangor